The Central line is a London Underground line that runs through central London, from , Essex, in the north-east to  and  in west London. It is one of only two lines on the Underground network to cross the Greater London boundary, the other being the Metropolitan line. One of London's deep-level railways, Central line trains are smaller than those on British main lines.

The line was opened as the Central London Railway in 1900, crossing central London on an east–west axis along the central shopping street of Oxford Street to the financial centre of the City of London. It was later extended to the western suburb of Ealing. In the 1930s, plans were created to expand the route into the new suburbs, taking over steam-hauled outer-suburban routes to the borders of London and beyond to the east. These projects were mostly realised after the Second World War, when construction stopped and the unused tunnels were used as air-raid shelters and factories. The Central line has mostly been operated by automatic train operation since a major refurbishment in the 1990s, although all trains still carry drivers.

In terms of total passengers, the Central line is the second busiest on the Underground. In 2016/17 over 280 million passenger journeys were recorded on the line. As of 2013, it operated the second-most frequent service on the network, with 34 trains per hour (tph) operating for half-an-hour in the westbound direction during the morning peak, and between 27 and 30 tph during the rest of the peak.

History

Central London Railway 

The Central London Railway (CLR) was given permission in 1891 for a tube line between Shepherd's Bush and a station at Cornhill, and the following year an extension to Liverpool Street was authorised, with a station at Bank instead of at Cornhill. The line was built following the streets above rather than running underneath buildings, because purchase of wayleave under private properties would have been expensive, and as a result one line runs above another in places, with platforms at different levels at St Paul's, Chancery Lane and Notting Hill Gate stations. The tunnels generally rise approaching a station, to aid braking, and fall when leaving, to aid acceleration.

The Central London Railway was the first underground railway to have the station platforms illuminated electrically. All the platforms were lit by Crompton automatic electric arc lamps, and other station areas by incandescent lamps. Both the City and South London Railway and the Waterloo and City Railway were lit by gas lamps, primarily because the power stations for these lines were designed with no spare capacity to power electric lighting. With the white glazed tiling, all underground Central London Railway platforms were very brightly lit. The use of electric lighting was further made possible because the Central London was also the first tube railway to use AC electrical distribution and the substation transformers were easily able to provide convenient voltages to run the lighting. Earlier tube lines generated DC power at the voltage required to run the trains (500 volts).

The line between Shepherd's Bush and Bank was formally opened on 30 June 1900, public services beginning on 30 July. With a uniform fare of 2d the railway became known as the "Twopenny Tube". It was initially operated by electric locomotives hauling carriages, but the locomotive's considerable unsprung weight caused much vibration in the buildings above the line, and the railway rebuilt the locomotives to incorporate geared drives. This allowed higher-speed and lighter motors to be used, which reduced the overall weight of the locomotive as well as the unsprung weight. The railway also tried an alternative approach: it converted four coaches to accommodate motors and control gear. Two of these experimental motor coaches were used in a 6-coach train, the control gear being operated by the system used on the Waterloo and City Railway. The modified locomotives were a considerable improvement, but the motor coaches of an even lower weight were much better still. The CLR ordered 64 new motor cars designed to use Sprague's recently developed traction control system. The CLR was exclusively using the resulting electric multiple units by 1903.

In July 1907, the fare was increased to 3d for journeys of more than seven or eight stations. The line was extended westwards with a loop serving a single platform at Wood Lane for the 1908 Franco-British Exhibition. A reduced fare of 1d, for a journey of three or fewer stations, was introduced in 1909, and season tickets became available from 1911. The extension to Liverpool Street opened the following year, providing access to the Great Eastern station and the adjacent Broad Street station by escalators. The Central London Railway was absorbed into the Underground Group on 1 January 1913.

In 1911, the Great Western Railway won permission for a line from Ealing Broadway to a station near to the CLR's Shepherd's Bush station, with a connection to the West London Railway, and agreement to connect the line to the Central London Railway and for the CLR to run trains to Ealing Broadway. Construction of the extension from the CLR to Ealing Broadway started in 1912 but opening was delayed by World War I. The CLR purchased new rolling stock for the extension, which arrived in 1915 and was stored before being lent to the Bakerloo line. The rolling stock returned when the extension opened in 1920.

In 1912, plans were published for a railway from Shepherd's Bush to Turnham Green and Gunnersbury, allowing the Central London Railway to run trains on London and South Western Railway (L&SWR) tracks to Richmond. The route was authorised in 1913 but work had not begun by the outbreak of war the following year. In 1919, an alternative route was published, with a tunnelled link to the disused L&SWR tracks south of their Shepherd's Bush station then via Hammersmith (Grove Road) railway station. Authorisation was granted in 1920, but the connection was never built, and the L&SWR tracks were used by the Piccadilly line when it was extended west of Hammersmith in 1932.

London Transport and the Second World War 
On 1 July 1933, the Central London Railway and other transport companies in the London area were amalgamated to form the London Passenger Transport Board, generally known as London Transport. The railway was known as the "Central London Line", becoming the "Central line" in 1937. The 1935–40 New Works Programme included a major expansion of the line. To the west new tracks were to be built parallel with the Great Western Railway's New North Main Line as far as Denham. To the east, new tunnels would run to just beyond Stratford station, where the line would be extended over the London & North Eastern Railway suburban branch to Epping and Ongar in Essex, as well as a new underground line between Leytonstone and Newbury Park mostly under Eastern Avenue so as to serve the new suburbs of north Ilford and the Hainault Loop. Twenty two level crossings would also be removed, grade separating the line. Platforms at central London stations would also be lengthened to allow for 8-car trains.

Construction started, the tunnels through central London being expanded and realigned and the stations lengthened, but it proved impossible to modify Wood Lane station to take 8-car trains and a new station at White City was authorised in 1938. The line was converted to the London Underground four-rail electrification system in 1940. The positive outer rail is  higher than on other lines, because even after reconstruction work the tunnels are slightly smaller. Most of the tunnels for the extensions to the east of London had been built by 1940, but work slowed due to the outbreak of the Second World War until eventually being suspended in June. The unused tunnels between Leytonstone and Newbury Park were equipped by the Plessey Company as an aircraft components factory, opening in March 1942 and employing 2,000 people. Elsewhere, people used underground stations as night shelters during air raids. The unopened Bethnal Green station had space for 10,000 people. In March 1943, 173 people died there when a woman entering the shelter fell at the bottom of the steps and those following fell on top of her.

Post war

Construction restarted after the war, and the western extension opened as far as Greenford in 1947 and West Ruislip in 1948. The powers to extend the line to Denham were never used due to post-war establishment of the Green Belt around London, which restricted development of land in the area. The eastern extension opened as far as Stratford in December 1946, with trains continuing without passengers to reverse in the cutting south of Leyton. In 1947, the line opened to Leytonstone, and then Woodford and Newbury Park. Stations from Newbury Park to Woodford via Hainault and from Woodford to Loughton were served by tube trains from 1948. South of Newbury Park, the west-facing junction with the main line closed in the same year to allow expansion of Ilford carriage depot. The extension transferred to London Underground management in 1949, when Epping began to be served by Central line trains. The single line to Ongar was served by a steam autotrain operated by British Rail (BR) until 1957, when the line was electrified. BR trains accessed the line via a link from Temple Mills East to Leyton.

The Central line stations east of Stratford kept their goods service for a time, being worked from Temple Mills, with the Hainault loop stations served via Woodford. The BR line south of Newbury Park closed in 1956 and Hainault loop stations lost their goods service in 1965, the rest of the stations on the line following in 1966. Early morning passenger trains from Stratford (Liverpool Street on Sundays) ran to Epping or Loughton until 1970. The single-track section from Epping to Ongar was electrified in 1957 and then operated as a shuttle service using short tube trains. However, carrying only 100 passengers a day and losing money, the section closed in 1994, and is now used by the heritage Epping Ongar Railway.

The entire Central line was shut between January and March 2003, after 32 passengers were injured when a train derailed at Chancery Lane due to a traction motor falling on to the track. The line was not fully reopened until June. In 2003, the infrastructure of the Central line was partly privatised in a public–private partnership, managed by the Metronet consortium. Metronet went into administration in 2007, and Transport for London (TfL) took over its responsibilities.

Route

Map

Railway line 

The line is predominantly double-track, widened to three tracks for short sections south of Leytonstone and west of White City; no track is shared with any other line, though some sections do run parallel to other routes.

The single-track line north of Epping, which closed in 1994, is now the Epping Ongar heritage railway.  shuttle services operate at weekends between North Weald and Ongar and North Weald and Coopersale. These do not call at Blake Hall, as the station platform was removed by London Transport after the station closed, and the remaining building is now a private residence.

The section between Leyton and just south of Loughton is the oldest railway alignment in use on the current London Underground system, having been opened on 22 August 1856 by the Eastern Counties Railway (ECR). Loughton to Epping was opened on 24 April 1865 by the ECR's successor, the Great Eastern Railway (GER), along with the section to Ongar. The Hainault Loop was originally the greater part of the Fairlop Loop opened by the GER on 1 May 1903.

The line has three junctions:
 Woodford Junction is a flat junction
 north of Leytonstone the branch to Newbury Park descends into tube tunnels under the older route to Woodford
 west of North Acton there is another burrowing junction separating the lines to Ealing Broadway and West Ruislip.

That at Greenford was the last escalator with wooden treads on the system until it was replaced in March 2014. They were exempt from fire regulations because they were outside the tunnel system.

List of stations

Open stations

Former stations 
On the Denham extension, aborted due to its location in a sparsely populated area within the Metropolitan Green Belt:
Denham; it was never connected.
Harefield Road; it was never opened.
Wood Lane; closed 22 November 1947, replaced by White City.
British Museum; closed 24 September 1933, replaced by two new platforms at the Piccadilly line's Holborn station.
On the shuttle service from Epping to Ongar, closed in September 1994:
North Weald; it was first served by the Central line on 25 September 1949, taking over the Great Eastern Railway (GER)'s services. It closed on 30 September 1994.
Blake Hall; it was first served by the Central line 25 September 1949. The station closed on 31 October 1981.
Ongar; it was first served by the Central line, which took over the GER services, on 25 September 1949. It was closed on 30 September 1994

Rolling stock

Former rolling stock 

When the railway opened in 1900, it was operated by electric locomotives hauling carriages with passengers boarding via lattice gates at each end. The locomotives had a large unsprung mass, which caused vibrations that could be felt in the buildings above the route. After an investigation by the Board of Trade, by 1903 the carriages had been adapted to run as trailers and formed with new motor cars into electric multiple units. The Central London Railway trains normally ran with six cars, four trailers and two motor-cars, although some trailers were later equipped with control equipment to allow trains to be formed with 3 cars. Work started in 1912 on an extension to Ealing Broadway, and new more powerful motor-cars were ordered. These arrived in 1915, but completion of the extension was delayed because of World War I, and the cars stored. In 1917, they were lent to the Bakerloo line, where they ran on the newly opened extension to Watford Junction. Returning in 1920/21, and formed with trailers converted from the original carriages, they became the Ealing Stock. In 1925–28, the trains were rebuilt, replacing the gated ends with air-operated doors, allowing the number of guards to be reduced to two. After reconstruction of the Central London Railway tunnels, the trains were replaced by Standard Stock transferred from other lines and the last of the original trains ran in service in 1939.

The Standard Stock ran as 6-car trains until 1947, when 8-car trains became possible after Wood Lane was replaced by a new station at White City. More cars were transferred from other lines as they were replaced by 1938 Stock. In the early 1960s, there was a plan to re-equip the Piccadilly line with new trains and transfer its newer Standard Stock to the Central line to replace the older cars there, some of which had been stored in the open during the Second World War and were becoming increasingly unreliable. However, after the first deliveries of 1959 Stock were running on the Piccadilly it was decided to divert this stock to the Central line, together with extra non-driving motor cars to lengthen the trains from 7-car to 8-car. 1962 Stock was ordered to release the 1959 Stock for the Piccadilly line. The last Standard Stock train ran on the Central line in 1963, and by May 1964 all 1959 Stock had been released to the Piccadilly line.

The single track section from Epping to Ongar was not electrified until 1957, prior to which the service was operated by an autotrain, carriages attached to a steam locomotive capable of being driven from either end, hired from British Railways, and an experimental AEC three-car lightweight diesel multiple unit operated part of the shuttle service Monday-Friday in June 1952. Upon electrification, 1935 Stock was used, until replaced by four-car sets of 1962 Stock specially modified to cope with the limited current. The section closed in 1994, and is now the heritage Epping Ongar Railway.

A shuttle operated on the section from Hainault to Woodford after a train of 1960 Stock was modified to test the automatic train operation system to be used on the Victoria line. As each 1967 Stock train was delivered, it ran in test for three weeks on the shuttle service.

Current rolling stock 
When the signalling on the Central line needed replacement by the late 1980s, it was decided to bring forward the replacement of the 1962 Stock, due at about the time as the replacement of the 1959 Stock. The signalling was to be replaced with an updated version of the Automatic Train Operation (ATO) system used on the Victoria line, the line traction supply boosted and new trains built. Prototype trains were built with two double and two single doors hung on the outside of each carriage of the train, and with electronic traction equipment that gave regenerative and rheostatic braking.

In accordance with this plan, the first 8-car trains of 1992 Stock entered service in 1993, and while the necessary signalling works for ATO were in progress, One Person Operation (OPO) was phased in between 1993 and 1995. Automatic train protection was commissioned from 1995 to 1997 and ATO from 1999 to 2001, with a centralised control centre in West London.

The trains are currently undergoing a refurbishment programme known as CLIP (Central Line Improvement Programme). The trains will have passenger information displays, wheelchair areas and CCTV installed. The programme, which includes updating motors, lighting, doors and seats, is being carried out at a new Train Modification Unit (TMU) in Acton and is expected to complete in late 2023.

Depots 
There are three depots: Ruislip, Hainault and White City. White City depot first opened in 1900 when the initial line went into operation; Ruislip and Hainault depots were completed in 1939. During the Second World War, anti-aircraft guns were made at Ruislip Depot and the U.S. Army Transportation Corps assembled rolling stock at Hainault between 1943 and 1945. As part of the construction of the Westfield London shopping centre, the depot at White City was replaced underground, opening in 2007.

Services 
During the off-peak, services on the Central line are grouped by branch lines: trains on the West Ruislip branch run to/from Epping, while trains to/from Ealing Broadway run on the Hainault Loop. Services at peak times are less structured, and trains can run between any two terminus stations at irregular intervals (e.g. from Ealing Broadway to Epping).

, the typical off-peak service, in trains per hour (tph), is:
3tph between Ealing Broadway and Newbury Park;

The above services combine to give a total of 24 trains per hour each way (one every 2 minutes and 30 seconds) in the core section between White City and Leytonstone. At peak times, the frequency increases further, with up to 35 trains per hour each way in the core section.

A 24-hour Night Tube service began on the Central line on 19 August 2016, running on Friday and Saturday nights. Night tube services are:
3tph between Ealing Broadway and Hainault (via Newbury Park)
3tph between White City and Loughton

Peak-time frequency
In September 2013, the frequency in the morning peak period was increased to 35 trains per hour, giving the line the most intensive train service in the UK at the time. Before that date, the Victoria line held the record with 33 trains per hour; it regained it in May 2017 with an increased frequency of 36 trains per hour (one every 100 seconds) during peak periods.

Future and cancelled plans 

The Central crosses over the Metropolitan and Piccadilly lines' shared Uxbridge branch near West Ruislip depot, and a single track linking the two routes was laid in 1973. The London Borough of Hillingdon has lobbied TfL to divert some or all Central trains along this to Uxbridge, as West Ruislip station is located in a quiet suburb and Uxbridge is a much more densely populated regional centre. TfL has stated that the link will be impossible until the Metropolitan line's signalling is upgraded in 2017.

The Central line was the first Underground line to receive a complete refurbishment in the early 1990s, including the introduction of new rolling stock. A new generation of deep-level tube trains, as well as signalling upgrades, is planned for the mid-2020s, starting with the Piccadilly line, followed by the Bakerloo line and the Central line.

The proposed Crossrail 2 line, running from south-west to north-east London and due to open by 2030, was planned for a number of years to take over the Epping branch of the Central line between Leytonstone and Epping. As of 2013 the preferred route options for the line no longer include this proposal.

The Central line runs directly below Shoreditch High Street station and an interchange has been desired locally since it opened in 2010. The station would lie between Liverpool Street and Bethnal Green, one of the longest gaps between stations in inner London. Although there would be benefits to this interchange, it was ruled out on grounds of cost, the disruption it would cause to the Central line while being built and because the platforms would be too close to sidings at Liverpool Street and would not be developed until after the Crossrail-developed Elizabeth line is fully operational.

The developers of the First Central business park at Park Royal, west London, were planning a new station between North Acton and Hanger Lane. This would have served the business park and provided a walking distance interchange with Park Royal station on the Piccadilly line. This is not being actively pursued; London Underground said that the transport benefits of a Park Royal station on the Central line are not sufficiently high to justify the costs of construction.

References

Notes

Bibliography

External links 

 Central line facts  – Transport for London page with line facts and brief history
 Clive's Underground Line Guide
 A History of the London Tube Maps – 1914 tube map showing proposed extension to Gunnersbury 
 Epping Ongar Railway – The company currently owning the Epping and Ongar branch and running trains on it.
 

London Underground lines
Railway lines opened in 1900
Transport in the London Borough of Hillingdon
Transport in the London Borough of Ealing
Transport in the London Borough of Hammersmith and Fulham
Transport in the Royal Borough of Kensington and Chelsea
Transport in the City of Westminster
Transport in the London Borough of Camden
Transport in the City of London
Transport in the London Borough of Tower Hamlets
Transport in the London Borough of Newham
Transport in the London Borough of Waltham Forest
Transport in the London Borough of Redbridge
Transport in Epping Forest District
Automatic London Underground lines
Standard gauge railways in London